Nuala Nic Con Iomaire (died 16 July 2010) was an Irish playwright, producer, translator, artist and poet.

A native of An Cheathrú Rua Connemara, County Galway, Nic Con Iomaire was a daughter of Liam and Bairbre Mac Con Iomaire. She was married to Pádraic Harvey, with whom she had a daughter, Iseult.

Nic Con Iomaire wrote two plays, An tUisceadán (for the stage), and Páid (a radio play). Best known as a producer, she also worked as arts officer with An Béal Binn, a theatre company and a singing club in Bray, Co. Wicklow.

See also

 Mac Con Iomaire

External links
 http://www.tribune.ie/archive/article/2005/oct/09/eistigi-the-classics-have-been-given-a-fresh-spin/
 http://www.irishplayography.com/search/person.asp?PersonID=13196
 http://notices.irishtimes.com/5807241
 http://www.stronachgallery.com/artwork.asp?ArtID=2456&CatID=166&offset=30

2010 deaths
20th-century Irish dramatists and playwrights
21st-century Irish dramatists and playwrights
Irish women poets
Irish women dramatists and playwrights
Irish producers
Irish translators
People from County Dublin
People from County Galway
20th-century Irish poets
21st-century Irish poets
21st-century Irish-language poets
Irish-language writers
21st-century Irish women writers
20th-century Irish women writers